Haki (also Romanized as Ḩakī) is a village in Targavar Rural District, Silvaneh District, Urmia County, West Azerbaijan Province, Iran. At the 2006 census, its population was 622, in 104 families.

Haki is known for its  Assyrian and Kurdish population.

Notable people

 Donny George Youkhanna - Assyrian historian
Ammo Baba - Iraqi-Assyrian football legend
 Rabi Shura Mikhailian - Assyrian composer in the Assyrian Church of the East

References 

Populated places in Urmia County